tert-Butyl bromide (also referred to as 2-bromo-2-methylpropane) is an organic compound with the formula Me3CBr (Me = methyl). The molecule features a tert-butyl group attached to a bromide substituent. This organobromine compound is used as a standard reagent in synthetic organic chemistry. It is a colorless liquid.

Reactions
It is used to introduce tert-butyl groups.  Illustrative is the tert-butylation of cyclopentadiene to give di-tert-butylcyclopentadiene:
C5H6  +  2 NaOH  +  2 Me3CBr  →  (Me3C)2C5H4  +  2 NaBr  +  2 H2O

Other aspects
tert-Butyl bromide used to study the massive deadenylation of adenine based-nucleosides induced by halogenated alkanes (alkyl halides) under physiological conditions. 2-Bromo-2-methylpropane causes the massive deguanylation of guanine based-nucleosides and massive deadenylation of adenine based-nucleosides.

Phase transition from orthorhombic Pmn21 phase III at low temperatures (measurements from 95 K), to a disordered rhombohedral phase II at 205-213 K. Phase II can exist from 213-223 K, partly coincident with an FCC phase I, which can be observed between 210-250 K. Phase transitions have also been studied at high pressure (up to 300MPa)

References

Bromoalkanes
Tert-butyl compounds